Cistercian College, Roscrea or Roscrea College is a private boarding school in Ireland. It is a Roman Catholic seven-day and five-day boarding and day school for boys, founded in 1905. Its pupil population is primarily made up of boarding students with some day students also attending.

Location

Located within the grounds of Mount St. Joseph Abbey in County Offaly, Ireland, 2.5 miles west of Roscrea town, the school is managed by monks of the Trappist branch of the Cistercians. Surrounded by open wooded countryside and thirty acres of grounds and sports fields, it also adjoins the abbey's farm of 360 hectares. 

While County Tipperary is in Munster, the school does not play in Munster competitions. This is because the original property and lands are Mount Heaton House (now the guesthouse) and demense in the townland of Ballyskenagh, which is actually in the territory of Ely O'Carroll in County Offaly (formerly Kings County). The house, school, abbey, farm and playing fields are just across the county border from County Tipperary, and so the school plays its sport in Leinster competitions. Roscrea is the nearest large town and so the postal address is Roscrea, County Tipperary.

History
The school was founded by the Cistercian monks in 1905 as a monastic boarding school for boys and has educated students from all over Ireland and overseas. CCR is one of two monastic schools in Ireland and in 1990 a Board of Governors was appointed by the Abbot to govern the administration of the college.

In the 17th century, Dr Richard Heaton, a Yorkshire-born Church of Ireland clergyman and botanist, mortgaged the land, and his son Edward built the house on the remnants of castle and renamed it Mount Heaton. In 1877 it was in the ownership of the nationalist and Home Rule-supporting MP, the Catholic Count Arthur John Moore. Moore donated the six hundred-acre property, a mansion and its walled garden to the Cistercians. The Cistercians moved into Roscrea from their abbey at Mount Melleray in February 1878.  The church, built using a foundation stone from Roman Catacombs in 1879 was finally completed in 1881.

Centennial
The college celebrated its centenary year from September 2005 until September 2006, giving rise to many events, visits and talks from notable past students and their connections. The speakers included; President of Ireland Mary McAleese, Dick Spring, Brian Cowen, Mary Hanafin and Charlie McCreevy.

Closure risk and recovery
In February 2017 it was announced that the school would cease taking new enrollments due to financial difficulties caused by falling student numbers. However, following a public meeting attended by over 300 people, an action group made up of parents and past pupils was formed. The group was charged with raising funds to supplement the school's finances and developing a long term strategy to make the school self-sustaining again. Progress was made, and on 16 March 2017 it was announced that the school would remain open after funding was secured by past pupils and parents.

Following on from the fundraising, donations from former pupils and financial changes which saved the school from closure, as of 2017 Cistercian College was to offer scholarships to students who excel in a number of academic subjects and sports to cover 50% of school fees.

Ethos
The influence of the Abbey is an integral part of the college and daily life is influenced by the presence of the few remaining Cistercian monks. Though most of the school's current teaching staff are now lay-persons, a tiny number of Cistercian monks and brothers take part in the school's administration and chaplaincy. The college aspires to be a "Christian community of learning, a worshipping community with an awareness of the presence of God in daily life and in the preparation of pupils for adult life".

Extra-curricular activities

Yearbook and musical
Each year a musical is held, around the time of the mid-term break at Halloween. It is a tradition going back to the founding of the school.

The school yearbook is known as The Vexillum. Referred to by the boys as The Vex, it is produced annually towards the summer holidays and usually distributed on the final evening before the last summer exams. It is compiled by the pupils. It contains reports on sporting and non-sporting events throughout the year, including the hurling and rugby campaigns and 6th year profiles.

Sports
Pupils have the opportunity to receive coaching and compete in a number of sports. Team games are served by the facilities that include:
 Playing fields (rugby, hurling, gaelic football, and soccer)
 An all-weather pitch
 Heated indoor swimming pool
 Basketball court
 Tennis courts
 Gymnasium
The school's sports complex provides indoor facilities for a range of sporting activities.

The main sports played are rugby and hurling during the autumn and spring and athletics during the late spring early summer. The school's sporting colours are black and white. The school has produced professional rugby players, county hurlers and representatives on the Irish athletics team including in hammer and hurdles.

On St. Patrick's Day 2015, Cistercian College Roscrea's Senior Cup Team won the school's first ever Leinster Schools' Senior Challenge Cup. Roscrea are one of the oldest participants in the competition, going back to at least 1910, when they played in that years final. The school has a national and international reputation for sporting achievement. 

The students have access to a 9-hole golf course. A golf team participates each year in competition.

Horse riding is also undertaken in the college as well as show jumping, where students have represented the country at international competitions.

Debating and public speaking
Irish, English and German-language debating teams compete each year from Cistercian College. They have won several competitions, including the all-Ireland debating competition Comórtas an Phiarsaigh in 2010 and the GDI All-Ireland German Debating Competition in 2013 and 2019. In-house public speaking competitions take place in each year, with the Silver Medal being awarded to the winner from Third Year, and the Gold Medal to the winner from Sixth Year.

Noted past pupils

 Conor Brady – former editor of The Irish Times
 James Creedon – reporter for France24
 Michael Houlihan – former president of the Law Society of Ireland
 Augustine Martin (known as "Gus" Martin) – senator, professor of Anglo-Irish Literature at UCD, broadcaster and scholar

Politics
 David Andrews – former Minister for Foreign Affairs
 Barry Cowen – former Minister for Agriculture, Food and the Marine, TD
 Brian Cowen – former Taoiseach; Barry's brother
 Dick Spring – international rugby player; former Tánaiste
 Jim Glennon – international rugby player; former TD

Sport
 Gavin Duffy – international rugby player
 Ciaran Gaffney – rugby player for Connacht and Zebre
 Barry Glendenning – football journalist with The Guardian
 Jim Glennon – see "politics"
 Séamus Hennessy – All-Ireland medallist with the Tipperary senior hurling team
 Willie Mullins – racehorse trainer and former jockey
 Tadhg Leader – former rugby player and former place kicker for the Hamilton Tiger Cats
 Seán O'Brien – rugby player for Connacht
 Tiernan O'Halloran – rugby player for Connacht
 Dick Spring – see "politics"

Music
 Filippo Bonamici aka Fil Bo Riva – musician

See also
Mount St. Joseph Abbey

References

External links
Cistercian College, Roscrea – official website
Mount St. Joseph Abbey, Roscrea – official website

1905 establishments in Ireland
Boys' schools in the Republic of Ireland
Educational institutions established in 1905
Private schools in the Republic of Ireland
Catholic boarding schools in Ireland
Catholic secondary schools in the Republic of Ireland
Roscrea
Secondary schools in County Offaly
Secondary schools in County Tipperary
Trappist Order